Soul on Board is the debut solo studio album by English singer Curt Smith, released on 6 September 1993 by Vertigo and Phonogram Records.

The album was Smith's first musical venture after leaving pop rock band Tears for Fears in 1991. Preceded by the single "Calling Out", both the album and the single were ultimately unsuccessful and failed to chart in the UK. A second single, "Words", also failed to chart. Subsequently, the album was never released at all in the US, although advance promotional cassettes were distributed in the US in very limited quantities, indicating that a US release of the album was originally planned.

Smith himself later stated that he despises the album and alleges that he made it purely to fulfil his recording contract with Phonogram and Mercury Records.

Track listing

Personnel
Adapted from AllMusic.

 Michael Bays – art direction, design
 Jeff Bova – keyboards
 Kim Bullard – keyboards
 Peter Cox – background vocals
 Paulinho Da Costa – percussion
 Lynn Davis – background vocals
 Kevin Deane – keyboards, producer
 Steve Ferrone – drums
 Siedah Garrett – background vocals
 Franne Golde – background vocals
 Jeff Graham – engineer
 Mick Guzauski – engineer, mixing
 Scott Hull – mastering
 Chris Kimsey – engineer, producer
 Billy Livsey – keyboards, background vocals
 Paul Logus – engineer
 Jeff Lorenzen – engineer
 Jean McClain – background vocals
 Frank Ockenfels – photography
 Paul Orofino – engineer
 Martin Page – bass, engineer, keyboards, producer, background vocals
 Curt Smith – bass, guitar, primary artist, producer, vocals, background vocals
 Richard Sortomme – strings
 Neil Taylor – guitar, background vocals
 Ed Thacker – engineer
 Colin Woore – guitar

References

External links
 

1993 debut albums
Albums produced by Chris Kimsey
Curt Smith albums